The Coweta Public Library System (CPLS) is a group of four public libraries in Coweta County, Georgia, United States. The branches serve the towns of Grantville, Newnan, and Senoia.

The Coweta County Public Library uses the interlibrary loan system to share books between its branches. Members of the county library may check out and return books to any location and have access to over 180,000 books in the library collection.

History
The first public library in Coweta County was a Carnegie library funded by industrialist Andrew Carnegie in 1901. Accordingly, a teenager in the town of Newnan wrote to Carnegia requesting funds for a public library, and he provided a grant for $10,000 with the condition the town continue to pay for the running of the library after construction. Construction began August 4, 1903 and concluded the following year.

In 1987 the Carnegie library was replaced by a new building constructed on Hospital Road in Newnan. This new branch, the A. Mitchell Powell, Jr. Library, was constructed to modernize the city library and provide more space for book stacks, meeting areas, and public computers.

By 2007 the original Carnegie library was again vacant and a movement grew to bring the library back to the downtown area. By 2009 after renovations to the building the Carnegie library was re-purposed as a meeting area and pseudo-library with a non-circulating collection of books, magazines, and newspapers.

Branches

Library systems in neighboring counties
Atlanta–Fulton Public Library System to the north
West Georgia Regional Library to the northwest
Flint River Regional Library System to the east
Pine Mountain Regional Library System to the south
Troup-Harris Regional Library to the south west

References

External links
CPLS catalog

County library systems in Georgia (U.S. state)
Public libraries in Georgia (U.S. state)